Annabelle Janet Ewing (born 20 August 1960) is a Scottish politician and lawyer who has served as Deputy Presiding Officer of the Scottish Parliament, alongside Liam McArthur, since May 2021.  A member of the Scottish National Party (SNP), she has been the Member of the Scottish Parliament (MSP) for the Cowdenbeath constituency since 2016, having previously been an MSP for the Mid Scotland and Fife region from 2011 to 2016.

Ewing previously served in the British House of Commons as a Member of Parliament for Perth, from 2001 to 2005. She was Scotland's Minister for Youth and Women's Employment from 2014 to 2016, and Minister for Community Safety and Legal Affairs from 2016 to 2018. Her brother, Fergus Ewing, is also an MSP in the Scottish Parliament, and their mother, Winnie Ewing, previously served as an MSP, MP and MEP.

Background
Ewing was born on 20 August 1960 to Winnifred Margaret Ewing (née Woodburn) and Stewart Martin Ewing. Her mother is a prominent former Scottish politician. She attended Craigholme School for Girls in Glasgow and the University of Glasgow, where she graduated with a law degree.

Before becoming an MP, Ewing was a European Community competition lawyer in Brussels and ran a small legal practice.

She lives in Perthshire. Her mother is former SNP President, Winnie Ewing, who in the past was a member of three different parliaments — Westminster, the Scottish Parliament and the European Parliament. Her brother is MSP Fergus Ewing, and her sister-in-law was the late Margaret Ewing, who had been an MSP and Westminster MP. Her late father, Stewart Ewing was elected as an SNP district councillor for the Summerston Ward in Glasgow 1977, when he gained it from Dick Dynes, the then leader of the Labour Group on Glasgow District Council, a result described at the time by The Glasgow Herald as "an absolute sensation".

Ewing is a member of Shelter and Amnesty International. She has been involved in a number of Parliamentary campaigns, including fighting for the rights of Hepatitis C sufferers, and working to gain a public enquiry into the events at Princess Royal Barracks, Deepcut, where James Collinson, a constituent, died on 23 March 2002.

Political career
Ewing was first selected as a SNP candidate for the UK Parliament to contest a by-election for Hamilton South in 1999, the constituency where her mother had won a famous by-election victory in 1967. Labour had a comfortable majority at the 1997 election and despite a swing of 16% to the SNP in 1999, Labour's Bill Tynan won the seat.

In 2001, Ewing stood for the UK Parliament again, this time in Perth, where Roseanna Cunningham had been the MP. Ewing was elected, defeating the Conservative candidate by just 48 votes, giving her the narrowest majority in Scotland. In the 2005 election, following a boundary revision, she contested the new constituency of Ochil and South Perthshire, losing to the Labour party candidate, Gordon Banks.

She sought to become SNP candidate for Moray in the 27 April 2006 Scottish Parliament by-election to succeed her late sister-in-law, Margaret Ewing. She was defeated by North East Scotland MSP Richard Lochhead who went on to win the seat in the by-election.

She was later selected to contest the Falkirk East seat in the 2007 election on behalf of the SNP as a replacement for the previously selected candidate, the late Douglas Henderson. On 3 May 2007 she achieved a 9% swing from Labour to the SNP in Falkirk East, however this was not enough to displace the incumbent Cathy Peattie.

She contested Ochil and South Perthshire for a second time at the 2010 election, failing again to take it from Gordon Banks, this time on an increased (4%) swing away from the SNP to Labour. At the 2011 election Ewing was elected to the Scottish Parliament as an additional member for the Mid Scotland and Fife region.

She is famed due to an incident that occurred on 16 December 2004, whereby the Deputy Speaker removed her from the House as she refused to apologise for calling the then Defence Secretary Geoff Hoon a "back-stabbing coward" during exchanges over Geoff Hoon's plans to merge Scottish Regiments, including the Black Watch.

She was promoted to the Scottish Government on 21 November 2014 in Nicola Sturgeon's first Cabinet reshuffle. She became Minister for Youth and Women's Employment, transferring to the Community Safety and Legal Affairs portfolio in 2016. She left the government in June 2018.

After being re-elected in the 2021 election, Ewing was elected as one of the two Deputy Presiding Officers of the Scottish Parliament.

References

External links
 
profile at Scottish government website
Official website
Guardian
They Work For You
The Public Whip

1960 births
Living people
Politicians from Glasgow
Alumni of the University of Glasgow
Scottish women lawyers
20th-century Scottish lawyers
21st-century Scottish lawyers
Members of the Parliament of the United Kingdom for Scottish constituencies
Scottish National Party MPs
Female members of the Parliament of the United Kingdom for Scottish constituencies
UK MPs 2001–2005
Scottish National Party MSPs
Members of the Scottish Parliament 2011–2016
Members of the Scottish Parliament 2016–2021
Members of the Scottish Parliament 2021–2026
Ministers of the Scottish Government
Deputy Presiding Officers of the Scottish Parliament
Women members of the Scottish Government
Scottish lawyers
20th-century women lawyers
21st-century women lawyers
20th-century Scottish women